State Road 312 (SR 312) is a  state highway serving St. Augustine, Florida in the United States. Its western terminus is at SR 207, and its eastern terminus is at County Road A1A (CR A1A) near St. Augustine Beach.

Route description
State Road 312 begins at the intersection between SR 207 and SR 312, where SR 207 continues northeast into central St. Augustine. At the waterway, SR 312 enters St. Augustine city limits, where it intersects SR A1A. Continuing east, the state highway ends at the point CR A1A transitions to the roadway to continue heading east.

Major intersections

References

External links

312
312